The 2018 Belgian Road Cycling Cup (known as the Napoleon Games Cycling Cup for sponsorship reasons) was the third edition of the Belgian Road Cycling Cup. Jasper De Buyst was the defending champion.

Despite not winning any of the events, Timothy Dupont won his second title after already winning the 2016 edition.

Events
Compared to the previous season, the Grote Prijs Marcel Kint was added to the calendar, replacing the Handzame Classic.

Race results
Since 2017, only the top 15 riders score points for the general classification. Three intermediate sprints during each race award points to the top three riders.

Le Samyn

Dwars door West-Vlaanderen

GP Marcel Kint

Heistse Pijl

Championship standings
After Dwars door West-Vlaanderen

Individual

Teams

References

External links
  Official website
  Belgian Cycling Union 2018 Napoleon Games Cycling Cup Standings

Belgian Road Cycling Cup
Belgian Road Cycling Cup
Road Cycling Cup